This is a glossary of linear algebra.

See also: glossary of module theory.

A

B

C

D

E

I

L

M

N

R

S

U

V

Z

Notes

References
 
 
 

Linear algebra
Algebra
Wikipedia glossaries using description lists